Soul Shack is an album by American saxophonist Sonny Stitt and organist Jack McDuff, recorded in 1963 and issued on Prestige. If Primitivo Soul!, recorded in December of the same year, features mostly Latin-influenced jazz, Soul Shack features strong blues influences.

Track listing
All compositions by Sonny Stitt except where noted
"Sunday" (Chester Conn, Jule Styne, Bennie Krueger, Ned Miller) - 7:55
"Soul Shack" - 7:14
"Love Nest" (Louis Hirsch, Otto Harbach) - 6:17
"Hairy" - 5:56
"For You" (Joe Burke, Al Dubin) - 6:55
"Shadows" - 5:07

Personnel
Sonny Stitt - alto saxophone (tracks 4 and 6) tenor saxophone all others
Brother Jack McDuff - organ
Leonard Gaskin - bass
Herbie Lovelle - drums

References

Prestige Records albums
Sonny Stitt albums
1963 albums